In 2017, mpox reemerged in humans in Nigeria after 39 years. By the end of 2017, there were at least 115 confirmed cases.

History

When the first cases of human mpox were identified in the DRC, Liberia and Sierre Leone in 1970, there were no detected cases in Nigeria, and surveillance of several non-human primates in Nigeria did not identify any monkeypox virus. Two cases of mpox were first identified in Nigeria in 1971. The first case was a four year old female, whose rash began on 9 April.

2017 outbreak
In 2017, mpox reemerged in humans in Nigeria after 39-years. 

The first exportations of mpox out of Africa via affected humans occurred in September 2018, when three unrelated affected people from Nigeria travelled to the UK and Israel.

In 2021, cases of mpox were reported in Delta, Lagos, Bayelsa, Rivers, Edo, Federal Capital Territory, Niger, and Ogun.

References

External links
An Update of Monkeypox Outbreak in Nigeria. Nigeria Centre for Disease Control

Disease outbreaks in Nigeria
Mpox